Cynthia Lizeth Duque Garza (born September 18, 1992) is a Mexican beauty pageant titleholder who won Nuestra Belleza México 2012 and represented Mexico at Miss Universe 2013.

Duque was crowned Nuestra Belleza Mexico 2012 at the grand finale of the 19th annual Nuestra Belleza Mexico which was held at the Mesoamerican Poliforum Convention Center in the capital of Chiapas on Saturday, September 1, 2012.

Duque represented Mexico at Miss Universe 2013 on November 9, 2013, in Moscow, Russia where she failed to place in the semifinals.

She was fourth runner up at Mis Continentes Unidos 2016.

References 

Nuestra Belleza México winners
Beauty pageant contestants from Monterrey
1992 births
Living people
Miss Universe 2013 contestants
Mexican beauty pageant winners
Mexican female models